Harry George Galt, sometimes called Harry St. George Galt, was a British coloniser and white supremacist newly appointed as the subcommissioner of the Western Province of Uganda, a British protectorate, and was killed in Ibanda, Kagongo.

Background
Galt was born on 28 January 1872 in Emsworth in Hampshire in Great Britain to Edwin Galt JP and Marion Galt. He attended Lancing College.

Official work and death
Being posted to the British colony of Uganda, he was first appointed as the tax collector of the Ankole Sub-region. He was later appointed as the sub-commissioner of the Western Uganda province.

He is said to have been a cruel officer who treated the local people harshly. On 19 May 1905, as a newly appointed officer, Galt forced the local people to carry him on their heads from Fort Portal to Ibanda, refusing to let them rest.

The local people carried him up to Katooma, 3 km from Ibanda, before the Kagongo Catholic Church where he stopped and rested in a government house. When the local people started talking about his cruelty, a native man named Rutaraka got annoyed with the officer's acts and threw a spear at Galt, who was sitting in the government house compound; it struck Galt in the chest and he died after a short time.

The colonial government investigated the cause of Galt's death. They thought it was politically motivated and sentenced two Ankole chiefs to the death penalty which was later cancelled on appeal by the British East African Court.

Rutaraka was later found dead as he committed suicide by hanging himself, fearing what would follow. Galt's body was taken for burial and the colonial government punished the natives by making them pile stones to cover the blood of Galt. They piled stones making a pyramid-like feature 5 m long and 3 m high which still stands as of 2015.

A street in Mbarara has been named after him, Galt Road which starts on Stanley Road on Booma Hill opposite the public library.

References

1872 births
1905 deaths
People from Emsworth
British colonial officials
English people murdered abroad
People murdered in Uganda
Deaths by blade weapons
Murder–suicides in Africa
People educated at Lancing College

nds:Harry Galt
Journalist Abraham Turyatunga [ URN] on original source 18 march 2018 retrieved 15 February 2023